The Beigang Cultural Center is a cultural center in Beigang Township, Yunlin County, Taiwan.

History
The tender to construct the center was held in May 2012. Construction of the building started in February 2014 and completed a year later in February 2015.

Architecture
The center was designed by MAYU architects+. It was constructed on a 7,652 m2 of land with building area of 2,053 m2 and a total floor area of 2,918 m2.

See also
 List of tourist attractions in Taiwan

References

External links
 

2015 establishments in Taiwan
Cultural centers in Yunlin County
Event venues established in 2015